E60 or E 60 may refer to:

Transportation
 European route E60, a highway running from France to Kyrgyzstan
 BMW E60, a 2003-2010 platform number for the BMW 5 Series luxury German sedans
 GE E60, an American boxcab electric locomotive
 Mercedes-Benz E-60 AMG, in the Mercedes-Benz W124 series
 New Flyer E60, a high-floor trolleybus
 Obihiro-Hiroo Expressway, route E60 in Japan

Other uses
 Nokia E60, a mobile phone
 E:60, a sports television program on ESPN
 Electronika 60, a computer
 King's Indian Defence (Encyclopaedia of Chess Openings code)